Praja Shanti Party is an Indian political party in the states of Andhra Pradesh and Telangana, founded by the noted evangelist K. A. Paul. The party was registered in 2008.

Overview 
Praja Shanti Party contested in the 2019 Andhra Pradesh Legislative Assembly election along with 2019 Lok Sabha election. Its symbol is Helicopter.

In 2022 after the defeat of Praja Shanti Party in 2019 Andhra Pradesh Legislative Assembly election, Paul claimed to contest in the upcoming 2023 Telangana Legislative Assembly election.

In September 2022, Election Commission of India delisted Praja Shanti Party stating that it violates the provisions of the Representation of the People Act, 1951.

Electoral performance

References

Political parties established in 2008
Regionalist parties in India
Political parties in Andhra Pradesh
2008 establishments in Andhra Pradesh